Opdenbosch's mangabey (Lophocebus opdenboschi) is a species of crested mangabey in the family Cercopithecidae. It has also been treated as a subspecies of Lophocebus aterrimus. It is found in the Democratic Republic of the Congo (formerly Belgian Congo).

References

Opdenbosch's mangabey
Primates of Africa
Mammals of Angola
Mammals of the Democratic Republic of the Congo
Opdenbosch's mangabey
Opdenbosch's mangabey
Taxobox binomials not recognized by IUCN